The 2008 Turkmenistan Higher League (Ýokary Liga) season was the 16th season of the Turkmenistan League, Turkmenistan's premier football league. It began on 12 April 2008.

FC Bagtyýarlyk, FC Ahal, Gara Altyn Balkanabat and FC Altyn Asyr make up the four teams promoted to Turkmenistan's top flight.
Conspicuous by their absence is Köpetdag Aşgabat, the six-time Turkmenistan champions and 1997/98 AFC Asian Cup Winners' Cup semi-finalists who have had to disband due to financial reasons.
in July, Lebap (Türkmenabat) were renamed Bagtyýarlyk;

Premier League Teams (2008)

Final League standings

Top goalscorers

Ýokary Liga seasons
Turk
Turk
1